Dustin Stoltzfus (born November 15, 1991) is an American mixed martial artist who competes in the Middleweight division of the Ultimate Fighting Championship.

Background
Stoltzfus grew up in the Pennsylvania Dutch community outside of Ronks, Pennsylvania to former Amish parents. Stoltzfus started folkstyle wrestling as a child, moving to Tang Soo Do, Kung Fu and other martial arts growing up. After graduating from Lampeter-Strasburg High School, he attended Middle Tennessee State University, where he also got introduced to Brazilian jiu-jitsu. He graduated with Bachelor's in both foreign languages and economics, and subsequently moved to Germany – where he had already studied abroad – in 2014. In Germany he attended Johannes Gutenberg University Mainz where he graduated with Master's in translation.

Mixed martial arts career

Early career
Stoltzfus fought once as an amateur in 2012, losing via decision. Two years later, he began competing as a professional in the Central-European regional circuit. He compiled a 12–1 record while claiming the FFA Middleweight Championship and defending it twice.

Dana White's Contender Series
Stoltzfus was then invited to face Joseph Pyfer at Dana White's Contender Series 28 on August 11, 2020. He won the fight via technical knockout due to an injury stemming from a slam and was awarded a contract with the UFC.

Ultimate Fighting Championship
Stoltzfus made his promotional debut against Kyle Daukaus at UFC 255 on November 21, 2020. He lost the fight via unanimous decision.

Stoltzfus faced Rodolfo Vieira at UFC on ESPN: Makhachev vs. Moisés on July 17, 2021. He lost the fight via third-round submission.

Stoltzfus was expected to face Anthony Hernandez at UFC Fight Night: Lewis vs. Daukaus on December 18, 2021. However, Hernandez withdrew from the event due to undisclosed reasons and was replaced by newcomer Caio Borralho. In turn, Borralho and Gerald Meerschaert's opponent, Abusupiyan Magomedov, were forced to withdraw from the fight due to visa issues, thus the UFC matched Meerschaert and Stoltzfus against each other for the event. He lost the bout via rear-naked choke in the third round.

Stoltzfus faced Dwight Grant on July 16, 2022 at UFC on ABC 3. He won the fight via unanimous decision.

Stoltzfuss faced Abusupiyan Magomedov, replacing injured Makhmud Muradov, on September 3, 2022 at UFC Fight Night 209. He lost the fight via knockout in 17 seconds.

Professional kickboxing
Stoltzfus fought once as a professional kickboxer in 2018, against Romanian Sebastian Cozmanca. Stoltzfus was defeated via first-round knockout.

Championships and accomplishments
We Love MMA
FFA Middleweight Championship (One time)
Two successful title defenses

Mixed martial arts record

|-
|Loss
|align=center|14–5
|Abus Magomedov
|KO (front kick and punches)
|UFC Fight Night: Gane vs. Tuivasa
|
|align=center|1
|align=center|0:19
|Paris, France
|
|-
|Win
|align=center|14–4
|Dwight Grant
|Decision (unanimous)
|UFC on ABC: Ortega vs. Rodríguez
|
|align=center|3
|align=center|5:00
|Elmont, New York, United States
|
|-
|Loss
|align=center|13–4
|Gerald Meerschaert
|Submission (rear-naked choke)
|UFC Fight Night: Lewis vs. Daukaus
|
|align=center|3
|align=center|2:59
|Las Vegas, Nevada, United States
|
|-
|Loss
|align=center|13–3
|Rodolfo Vieira
|Submission (rear-naked choke)
|UFC on ESPN: Makhachev vs. Moisés
|
|align=center|3
|align=center|1:54
|Las Vegas, Nevada, United States
|
|-
|Loss
|align=center|13–2
|Kyle Daukaus
|Decision (unanimous)
|UFC 255
|
|align=center| 3
|align=center| 5:00
|Las Vegas, Nevada, United States
|
|-
|Win
|align=center|13–1
|Joseph Pyfer
|TKO (elbow injury)
|Dana White's Contender Series 28
|
|align=center|1
|align=center|4:21
|Las Vegas, Nevada, United States
|
|-
|Win
|align=center|12–1
|Nihad Nasufovic
|Submission (twister)
|German MMA Championship 23
|
|align=center|3
|align=center|3:33
|Oberhausen, Germany
|
|-
|Win
|align=center|11–1
|Jonas Billstein
|KO (punches)
|German MMA Championship 20
|
|align=center|2
|align=center|1:39
|Berlin, Germany
|
|-
|Win
|align=center|10–1
|Filip Zadruzynski
|Submission (guillotine)
|We Love MMA 44
|
|align=center|1
|align=center|2:21
|Berlin, Germany
|
|-
|Win
|align=center|9–1
|Roman Kapranov
|Submission (rear-naked choke)
|We Love MMA 39
|
|align=center|1
|align=center|2:37
|Ludwigshafen, Germany
|
|-
|Win
|align=center|8–1
|Selim Agaev
|Decision (unanimous)
|Fair FC 7
|
|align=center|3
|align=center|5:00
|Bochum, Germany
|
|-
|Win
|align=center|7–1
|Mario Wittmann
|Submission (rear-naked choke)
|We Love MMA 30
|
|align=center|1
|align=center|4:36
|Ludwigshafen, Germany
|
|-
|Win
|align=center|6–1
|David Moscatelli
|Decision (unanimous)
|We Love MMA 26
|
|align=center|3
|align=center|5:00
|Basel, Switzerland
|
|-
|Win
|align=center|5–1
|Eugen Weber
|Submission (kneebar)
|We Love MMA 17
|
|align=center|1
|align=center|1:45
|Stuttgart, Germany
|
|-
|Win
|align=center|4–1
|Arda Adas
|DQ
|We Love MMA 15
|
|align=center|2
|align=center|N/A
|Berlin, Germany
|
|-
|Loss
|align=center|3–1
|Christian Skorzik
|Decision (unanimous)
|Fair FC 3
|
|align=center|3
|align=center|5:00
|Herne, Germany
|
|-
|Win
|align=center|3–0
|Abu Dzhamaldaev
|Decision (unanimous)
|Age of Cage 4
|
|align=center|3
|align=center|5:00
|Stuttgart, Germany
|
|-
|Win
|align=center|2–0
|Rasul Alautdinov
|Decision (unanimous)
|We Love MMA 11
|
|align=center|2
|align=center|5:00
|Berlin, Germany
|
|-
|Win
|align=center|1–0
|Kiril Kolomeitsev
|Decision (split)
|We Love MMA 10
|
|align=center|2
|align=center|5:00
|Stuttgart, Germany
|

See also 
 List of current UFC fighters
 List of male mixed martial artists

References

External links 
  
 

1991 births
Living people
American male mixed martial artists
Middleweight mixed martial artists
Mixed martial artists utilizing Tang Soo Do
Mixed martial artists utilizing wushu
Mixed martial artists utilizing Luta Livre
Mixed martial artists utilizing Brazilian jiu-jitsu
Ultimate Fighting Championship male fighters
American tang soo do practitioners
American wushu practitioners
American practitioners of Brazilian jiu-jitsu
Sportspeople from Lancaster, Pennsylvania
Pennsylvania Dutch people